A by-election was held for the New South Wales Legislative Assembly electorate of East Sydney on 15 July 1879 because Alexander Stuart resigned. Stuart had been appointed agent-general however he was unable to take up the position due to financial difficulties.

Dates

Result

Alexander Stuart resigned.

See also
Electoral results for the district of East Sydney
List of New South Wales state by-elections

References

1879 elections in Australia
New South Wales state by-elections
1870s in New South Wales